The 2012 Saskatchewan Huskies football team represented the University of Saskatchewan in the 2012 CIS university football season. They played their home games at Griffiths Stadium in Saskatoon, Saskatchewan. The team had hopes to win Canada West and to advance to the Vanier Cup for the first time in 6 years, however they lost to the Regina Rams in the Canada West Semi-Final.

Recruiting

Recruits

Rankings

RV - Received Votes

Preseason

Regular season
The 2012 schedule is as follows:

Playoffs

Radio
All Huskies football games were carried on CK750. The radio announcers were Branden Crowe and Kelly Bowers.

Roster

Game Notes

Vs. Guelph

Vs. Alberta

At Manitoba

At UBC

Vs. Regina

At Calgary

Vs. Manitoba

At Alberta

Vs. UBC

At Regina

Awards

See also
 2012 CIS football season

References

External links
Saskatchewan Huskies Football Official Site

Saskatchewan Huskies
Saskatchewan Huskies football seasons